Lee Yi-kyung (born January 8, 1989) is a South Korean actor.

Career
Lee made his acting debut in 2011, and first gained recognition from playing a rebellious student in the teen drama School 2013. Thereafter, he played supporting roles in television dramas such as My Love from the Star (2013) and Descendants of the Sun (2016). Lee gained popularity following his comedic role in Confession Couple, and was cast in his first major role in  Welcome to Waikiki (2018). 2018 was professionally successful for Lee, as he also played the lead actor in the critically well-received "Children of Nobody".

Lee has also appeared in both independent and commercial films, notably Leesong Hee-il's White Night (2012) and Kim Ki-duk's One on One (2014). In 2018, he stars in two films - drama film Monsters (also known as Wretches) which tackles teenage bullying; and omnibus horror film Pension: Dangerous Encounter.

On March 8, 2022, it was reported that Lee's contract with HB Entertainment has ended. Later on March 25, 2022, Lee signed with Screening ENT after the expiration of his contract with the original agency.

Personal life
His father is the CEO of LG Innotek, Lee Ung-beom.

In April 2018, it was announced Lee was dating his Welcome to Waikiki co-star Jung In-sun. The couple was introduced by Lee's friend actor Lee Ki-woo and had been dating for a year before the news broke. However, in June 2018, the couple confirmed they have broken up.

Filmography

Film

Television series

Web series

Television show

Web show

Radio shows

Music video

Hosting

Theater

Discography

Singles

Awards and nominations

References

External links 
 
 
 
 

1989 births
Living people
21st-century South Korean male actors
South Korean male television actors
South Korean male film actors
South Korean male web series actors
Seoul Institute of the Arts alumni